Anisochaeta is the scientific name of two genera of organisms and may refer to:

Anisochaeta (annelid), a genus of worms in the family Megascolecidae
Anisochaeta (plant), a genus of plants in the family Asteraceae